The 2004 Bob Jane T-Marts 1000 was a motor race for V8 Supercars, staged on 10 October 2004 at the Mount Panorama Circuit just outside Bathurst in New South Wales, Australia. It was Round 10 of the 2004 V8 Supercar Championship Series.

The event was the eighth Australia 1000, first held after the organisational split over the Bathurst 1000 that occurred in 1997. The race was staged four days after the 41st anniversary of the first Bathurst 500/1000 touring car endurance race which was held at the Mount Panorama Circuit in 1963. The 2004 event was the 47th race with a lineage back to the 1960 Armstrong 500 held at Phillip Island.

The race was won by 2003 winners Greg Murphy and Rick Kelly driving a Kmart Racing Team entered Holden Commodore (VY). It was the sixth consecutive Bathurst 1000 victory for Holden, a new record. The 2004 event was the 32nd and last Bathurst 500/1000 for nine time race winner Peter Brock. He did not get to drive in the actual race however as Jason Plato, his British co-driver in the #05 Holden Racing Team Holden Commodore (VY), crashed heavily on lap 31, putting the car out of the race.

Entry List
35 cars were entered in the race – 16 Ford Falcons and 19 Holden Commodores. Three cars were of the pre-2003 Group 3A regulation set. Amongst the debutants were former Formula One driver Alex Yoong, future championship race winners Fabian Coulthard and Lee Holdsworth and future New Zealand Touring Cars champion John McIntyre. Nine time Bathurst winner Peter Brock and 1988 race winner Tomas Mezera made their final start in the event.

Qualifying

Qualifying

Top 10 Shootout

Starting grid
The following table represents the final starting grid for the race on Sunday:

Race results

Statistics
 Provisional Pole Position (set in Qualifying) - #15 Greg Murphy - 2:08.0940
 Pole Position (set in Top 10 Shootout) - #11 Steven Richards - 2:07.9611
 Race time of winning car - 6:29:36.2055
 Race Average Speed - 154 km/h
 Winning margin - 9.5738s
 Fastest Lap - #50 Jason Bright - 2:08.8927 (173.52 km/h) on lap 94

References

External links
 Official race results
 Official V8 Supercar website

Motorsport in Bathurst, New South Wales
Bob Jane T-Marts 1000